is a village located in Miyake Subprefecture, Tokyo Metropolis, Japan. , the village had an estimated population of 328, and a population density of 16 persons per km².

Geography
Warmed by the Kuroshio Current, the village has a warmer and wetter climate than central Tokyo.

Neighboring municipalities
Tokyo Metropolis
Niijima, Tokyo
Kōzushima, Tokyo

History
Mikurajima Village was founded on October 1, 1923, when the Izu islands were administratively divided into villages and town.

Economy
The village economy is dominated by seasonal tourism supplemented by forestry and commercial fishing. There is also some small-scale farming.  Tourists come for sports fishing and scuba diving. Due to its difficulty of access, it receives considerably fewer visitors than the other islands in the Izu chain. Due to the low population and limited number of visitors, the natural habitat remains relatively untainted. Electric power on to the village is provided by a small hydroelectric power plant.

Transportation
Mikurajima has no major harbor. Apart from the dolphin tours, access to the island is limited to the Tōkai Kisen ferry that sails from Miyakejima and helicopter to Hachijōjima, Izu Ōshima and Miyakejima.

Education
The village operates a public elementary and junior high school, Mikurajima Elementary and Junior High School (御蔵島小中学校).

See also

Izu Islands

External links

Mikurajima Village Official Website

References 

Villages of Tokyo
Populated coastal places in Japan
Izu Islands